Lala was a  Turkish and Persian title (of Persian origin)  meaning tutor and statesman in the Ottoman  and Safavid Empire.

History 
In Ottoman tradition, lalas were the experienced statesmen who were assigned as the tutors of young princes (. While still teenagers, the princes were sent to provinces (sanjak) as provincial governors. They were accompanied by their lalas who trained them in statesmanship. The purpose of this practice was to prepare the princes for the future duty of regency. Later, when the prince was enthroned as the sultan his lala was usually promoted to be a vizier. 
Up to the 13th sultan Mehmet III (the end of the 16th century) all sultans enjoyed a period of provincial governorship prior to their reign. However, 14th sultan Ahmed I (1603–1617) who was enthroned in early teens without a period of provincial governorship, banned this practice. This meant the decrease in the status of the lala.

Atabeg vs lala 
The practice of lala was even older than the Ottoman Empire. During the Seljuk Empire, the experienced statesmen accompanying the princes were called Atabeg or Atabey (a Turkic composite title meaning ancestor-lord). However, Seljuk Empire was highly feudalistic and atabeys frequently used their power for separatist policies whenever they felt a weakness in the central authority. (like Eldiguzids in Azerbaijan and Zengids) 
The Ottoman Empire, on the other hand was more centralist and almost no lala tried to follow a separatist policy.

Some grand viziers of lala background

See also 
 Lalla (title)

References 

 
Government of the Ottoman Empire
Government of Safavid Iran
Ottoman titles
Titles in Iran
Titles in Bosnia and Herzegovina during Ottoman period